Henry Jean Guy Gauthier (30 December 1875 in Jarnac, Charente – 23 October 1938 in Cognac, Charente) was a French rugby union player who competed in the 1900 Summer Olympics. He was a member of the French rugby union team, which won the gold medal.

References

External links

profile

1875 births
1938 deaths
French rugby union players
Rugby union players at the 1900 Summer Olympics
Olympic rugby union players of France
Olympic gold medalists for France
Medalists at the 1900 Summer Olympics
Sportspeople from Charente
Stade Français players
Stade Bordelais players